Haraza is an extinct Hill Nubian language known only from a few dozen words recalled by village elders in 1923. It was spoken in the Jebel Haraza near Hamrat el-Wuz (Rilly 2010:166).

References

Nubian languages